Trigoniulus corallinus, sometimes called the rusty millipede or common Asian millipede, is a species of millipede widely distributed in the Indo-Malayan region including India, Sri Lanka, China, Taiwan, Myanmar, Thailand, Vietnam, Malaysia, Singapore, and much of Indonesia. It is also reported from Fiji and Tanzania and found in South Asia and the Caribbean as an introduced species. It has also been introduced to Florida, and as of 2022 is well-distributed throughout South and Central Florida, with limited sightings in the Northeast and Panhandle.

These millipedes inhabit moist areas, rotten wood and compost. The genome of T. corallinus was sequenced in 2015, the first time this has been done for a millipede.

References

Millipedes of Asia
Animals described in 1842
Spirobolida